Citizens in Rage ( (BIW)) is a German right-wing populist voters' association represented in the state parliament of Bremen. It is led by Jan Timke.

It was founded in March 2004 as a successor to the Bremen section of the Party for a Rule of Law Offensive ("Schill party"). Its focus has been on crime fighting and immigration policy.

The association participated in the 2007 Bremen parliamentary election. Bremen electoral law has a threshold that a party must surmount by winning 5% of the popular vote, either in the city of Bremen, or in Bremerhaven. Citizens in Rage contested the smaller constituency of Bremerhaven. According to the official results, the association won 2,216 votes or 4.998% – only one vote short of the threshold. Thereupon, Citizens in Rage requested a re-count. The competent court detected relevant mistakes in the elections in the constituency of Bremerhaven, and imposed an election rerun in one voting precinct. In the rerun on 6 July 2008, Citizens in Rage won 27.6% of the popular vote in the concerned precinct, which revised the Bremerhaven result of the movement up to 5.29% – enough for one seat in the state parliament.

In the 2011 Bremen state election, Citizens in Rage could report significant gains: they won 3.7% of the popular vote statewide – in contrast to 0.8% in 2007, and could defend their seat in the state legislative assembly.

Citizens in Rage see themselves as democratic conservative, although anti-establishment. Political scientists and observers classify the movement as right-wing populist, but not extremist or anti-constitutional.

Election results

Bürgerschaft of Bremen

References

External links
Official website (in German)

2004 establishments in Germany
Conservative parties in Germany
German nationalist political parties
Nationalist parties in Germany
Political parties established in 2004
Politics of Bremen (state)
Right-wing populism in Germany
Right-wing populist parties